Christian College, Kattakada is an Arts and Science College, under the Society for Education of the SIUC community of the Church of South India and registered under the Travancore-Cochin Literary, Scientific and Charitable Societies Registration Act XII of 1955. The college is located in a sprawling area in Kattakada under Kattakada taluk, 20 km east of Thiruvananthapuram city, the capital of Kerala.

The college offers undergraduate courses in various discipline including physics, chemistry, mathematics, statistics, Zoology and botany. Postgraduate courses are offered for physics, chemistry, and botany.

References

See also
Henry Baker College, Melukavu, Kottayam
 CMS College, Kottayam

Colleges affiliated to the University of Kerala
Universities and colleges in Thiruvananthapuram district
Arts and Science colleges in Kerala